Alexis Racloz (born 9 September 1966) is a Chilean alpine skier. He competed at the 1992 Winter Olympics and the 1994 Winter Olympics.

References

1966 births
Living people
Chilean male alpine skiers
Olympic alpine skiers of Chile
Alpine skiers at the 1992 Winter Olympics
Alpine skiers at the 1994 Winter Olympics
Sportspeople from Santiago
20th-century Chilean people